The South Grand Island Bridge is a pair of twin two-lane truss arch bridges spanning the Niagara River between Tonawanda and Grand Island in New York, United States. Each bridge carries one direction of Interstate 190 (I-190) and New York State Route 324 (NY 324). Both crossings are operated by the New York State Thruway Authority as part of the Niagara Thruway. The southbound span was opened in 1935 and acquired by the State of New York in 1950. The northbound span was finished in 1963. A northbound-only toll is collected via Electronic Tolling.

Description

The bridges are twin truss arch bridges with a steel through-arch in the middle. Both crossings have a  navigation clearance, which was designed to allow tall lake freighters and tanker ships to pass beneath it.
 
A northbound-only toll is presently collected via open-road cashless tolling. The open-road tolling began operating on March 29, 2018, replacing conventional toll booths. 
 The tollbooths were dismantled, and drivers are no longer able to pay cash at the bridge. Instead, drivers will travel beneath an overhead gantry where their E-ZPass transponder will be detected and charged.  Drivers without an E-ZPass will have a picture of their license plate taken, and the toll will be mailed to them.

History

The southbound bridge was completed in 1935.  Mr. Frank J. Offermann Sr., the former Sheriff of Erie County, owner of the Buffalo Bisons Ball Club and prominent resident of Grand Island was active in getting the bridges sanctioned. Also in 1935 after his untimely death, Supervisor Messmer proposed changing the name of the boulevard connecting the Grand Island Bridges to Offermann Drive, however this was never done, reference Buffalo Courier Express Feb 14, 1935. as a two-lane, two-way structure carrying NY 325 from Tonawanda to Grand Island. It became part of NY 324 by 1937. In 1950, the State of New York assumed ownership of the bridge as part of the Niagara Thruway's construction. A twin bridge erected to the northeast of the original structure was completed in 1963, at which time all northbound traffic was moved onto the new crossing and the 1935 span became southbound-only.

While the twin bridges were built decades apart, they appear nearly identical. It is clear that builders in the 1960s took great care in matching the original 1930s architecture, but there are slight differences. The 1935 bridge has stone cutwaters on the piers, while the 1963 bridge has steel-faced cutwaters. Also, renovations of the southbound bridge have created a guard rail that looks quite different from the one on the northbound bridge.

The northbound span was renovated by American Bridge Company from 2008 to 2010. American Bridge Company replaced the deck (road), sidewalk, and barriers as part of a $48 million project.

In August 2019, the bridges were closed to the public to be used as a filming site for A Quiet Place Part II.

See also
 
 
 
 List of crossings of the Niagara River
 North Grand Island Bridge

References

External links
 Pictures of South Grand Island Bridges 8-4-07
 Highlights of the History of Grand Island, NY
 American Bridge Company

Transportation buildings and structures in Buffalo, New York
Bridges completed in 1935
Bridges completed in 1962
Toll bridges in New York (state)
New York State Thruway Authority
Bridges over the Niagara River
Road bridges in New York (state)
Interstate 90
Bridges on the Interstate Highway System
Tolled sections of Interstate Highways
Truss arch bridges in the United States
Through arch bridges in the United States
Steel bridges in the United States
Transportation buildings and structures in Erie County, New York